Sequatchie County School Board is a school system based in Dunlap, Tennessee. The system serves three schools.

Schools

High schools 
Sequatchie County High School

Middle school 
Sequatchie County Middle School

Elementary schools 
Griffith Elementary School

See also 
Dunlap, Tennessee#Schools

References 

Schools in Sequatchie County, Tennessee
School districts in Tennessee